The 1942 Florida A&M Rattlers football team was an American football team that represented Florida A&M College as a member of the Southern Intercollegiate Athletic Conference (SIAC) during the 1942 college football season. In their seventh and final season under head coach "Big Bill" Bell, the Rattlers compiled a perfect 9–0 record, defeated  in the Orange Blossom Classic, and won the black college national championship. The Rattlers played their home games at Sampson-Bragg Field in Tallahassee, Florida.

Schedule

References

Florida AandM
Florida A&M Rattlers football seasons
College football undefeated seasons
Florida AandM Rattlers football
Black college football national champions